The Complete Tony Bennett/Bill Evans Recordings is a two-CD box set released in 2009 compiling the two recording sessions by singer Tony Bennett and pianist Bill Evans which produced The Tony Bennett/Bill Evans Album in 1975 and Together Again in 1976, including twenty alternate takes and two bonus tracks not released on the original albums.

Track listing

Disc one 
 "Young and Foolish" (Albert Hague, Arnold B. Horwitt) – 3:54
 "The Touch of Your Lips" (Ray Noble) – 3:56
 "Some Other Time" (Leonard Bernstein, Betty Comden, Adolph Green) – 4:42
 "When in Rome" (Cy Coleman, Carolyn Leigh) – 2:55
 "We'll Be Together Again" (Carl T. Fischer, Frankie Laine) – 4:38
 "My Foolish Heart" (Ned Washington, Victor Young) – 4:51
 "Waltz for Debby" (Bill Evans, Gene Lees) – 4:04
 "But Beautiful" (Johnny Burke, Jimmy Van Heusen) – 3:36
 "Days of Wine and Roses" (Henry Mancini, Johnny Mercer) – 2:23
 "The Bad and the Beautiful" (Dory Previn, David Raksin) – 2:18
 "Lucky to Be Me" (Bernstein, Comden, Green) – 3:45
 "Make Someone Happy" (Comden, Green, Jule Styne) – 3:53
 "You're Nearer" (Lorenz Hart, Richard Rodgers) – 2:23
 "A Child Is Born" (Thad Jones, Alec Wilder) – 3:17
 "The Two Lonely People" (B. Evans, Carol Hall) – 4:27
 "You Don't Know What Love Is" (Gene de Paul, Don Raye) – 3:27
 "Maybe September" (Ray Evans, Percy Faith, Jay Livingston) – 3:55
 "Lonely Girl" (R. Evans, Livingston, Neal Hefti) – 2:49
 "You Must Believe in Spring" (Alan Bergman, Marilyn Bergman, Jacques Demy, Michel Legrand) – 5:51
 "Who Can I Turn To (When Nobody Needs Me)"  (Leslie Bricusse, Anthony Newley) – 2:28 Bonus track not on original LP
 "Dream Dancing"  (Cole Porter) – 3:46 Bonus track not on original LP

Disc two 
 "Young and Foolish" alternate take 4 - 4:45
 "The Touch of Your Lips" alternate take 1 - 2:54
 "Some Other Time" alternate take 7 - 4:56
 "When in Rome" alternate take 11 - 2:57
 "Waltz for Debby" alternate take 8 - 3:50
 "The Bad and the Beautiful" alternate take 1 - 2:12
 "The Bad and the Beautiful" alternate take 2 - 2:09
 "Make Someone Happy" alternate take 5 - 3:54
 "You're Nearer" alternate take 9 - 2:58
 "A Child Is Born" alternate take 2 - 3:26
 "A Child Is Born" alternate take 7 - 3:12
 "The Two Lonely People" alternate take 5 - 4:43
 "You Don't Know What Love Is" alternate take 16 - 3:33
 "You Don't Know What Love Is" alternate take 18 - 3:37
 "Maybe September" alternate take 5 - 4:37
 "Maybe September" alternate take 8 - 4:31
 "Lonely Girl" alternate take 1 - 2:57
 "You Must Believe in Spring" alternate take 1 - 6:01
 "You Must Believe in Spring" alternate take 4 - 5:36
 "Who Can I Turn To?" alternate take 6 - 2:29

Personnel 
 Tony Bennett – vocals
 Bill Evans – piano

References 

2009 compilation albums
Bill Evans albums
Tony Bennett albums
Collaborative albums
Fantasy Records compilation albums